Jewels is a supporter's album by Einstürzende Neubauten, completed in mid-2007. Instead of being released as a full album, it was released digitally one track at a time, available as website downloads only to subscribers of the Phase III Supporter Project, consisting of 15 "jewels" (as the band called them). Starting in March 2006, these downloadable tracks were released on or around the 15th of each month and were drawn from singer Blixa Bargeld's dreams.

Despite the Supporter Project site saying it "would form a digital-only album that will not be otherwise available", the album was eventually re-issued and released commercially through their own Potomak label as The Jewels, in July 2008.

Track listing
 "Ich komme davon" (2:34), released March 15, 2006
 "Mei Ro" (2:03), released April 15, 2006
 "26 Riesen" (3:28), released May 15, 2006
 "Hawcubite" (1:30), released June 15, 2006
 "Die Libellen" (1:44), released July 15, 2006
 "Jeder Satz mit ihr hallt nach" (3:45), released August 15, 2006
 "Epharisto" (2:23), released September 15, 2006
 "Robert Fuzzo" (2:37), released October 15, 2006
 "Magyar energia" (3:01), released November 15, 2006
 "Vicki" (1:44), released December 15, 2006
 "Ansonsten Dostojevsky" (3:00), released January 16, 2007
 "Die Ebenen werden nicht vermischt" (6:26), released February 15, 2007
 "Am I only Jesus" (3:30), released June 15, 2007
 "Bleib" (3:23), released July 15, 2007
 "I kissed Glenn Gould" (2:44), released August 15, 2007

Notes
The commercial release, an enhanced CD, also included a QuickTime movie Acht Lösungen, exclusive to the release.

References

Einstürzende Neubauten compilation albums
2007 compilation albums